Sarah Baartman District Municipality (formerly Cacadu District Municipality) is situated in the western part of the Eastern Cape province, covering an area of 58,242 square kilometres. The area of the district municipality includes seven local municipalities. The seat of Sarah Baartman is the city of Gqeberha, although Gqeberha is not itself in the district (it is in the Nelson Mandela Bay Metropolitan Municipality). The languages most spoken among the 388,201 people are Xhosa and Afrikaans (2001 Census). The district code is DC10.

The municipality is a multi-ethnic administration, formed by the ANC government through the merging of the predominantly Afrikaans-speaking western part of the Eastern Cape, together with Xhosa areas near the Fish river, and the English district of Albany (with its own distinctive local culture, dating back to the 1820 settlers).

The name Cacadu is regarded by the Xhosa as covering the entire area of the district municipality, but in fact it is taken from a river that runs entirely in Gqeberha. Cacadu, meaning "bulrush water", is the Xhosa form of the Khoekhoe name of the river. The Dutch name is a translation: Papenkuils (in modern Afrikaans a bulrush is called a papkuil). The river rises in the Parsons Vlei and runs to the sea close to the Gqeberha industrial suburb of Deal Party.

In 2015, Cacadu District was renamed for Saartjie "Sarah" Baartman (1789–1815), a Khoikhoi woman who was taken to London to perform at freak shows and after her death her remains were exhibited until 1974. The renaming is part of an effort to redress marginalisation of the Khoikhoi people.

Government
The Executive Mayor of Sarah Baartman District Municipality is Khunjuzwa Eunice Kekana, and the Municipal Manager is Ted Pillay.

Geography

It extends to the Great Fish River in the east and the Sneeuberge in the north. The metropolitan area around Gqeberha is excluded from the district, being in the Nelson Mandela Bay Metropolitan Municipality.

The southwestern part of the district (west of Gqeberha) is marked by several ranges of mountains that run parallel to the sea, including the Baviaanskloof mountains, the Kouga mountains and the Tsitsikamma mountains. In the southeastern part (east of Port Elizabeth) is the Albany region around the city of Grahamstown. The northern interior of the district is the southeastern end of the Karoo.

To the west the district borders on the Garden Route and Central Karoo districts of the Western Cape; to the north it borders on the Pixley ka Seme district of the Northern Cape; and to the east it borders on the Chris Hani and Amathole districts of the Eastern Cape.

Sarah Baartman district is divided into nine local municipalities, as below:

After the municipal elections on 3 August 2016, the Camdeboo, Ikwezi and Baviaans municipalities were merged to form the new Dr Beyers Naudé Local Municipality, with its head offices in Graaff-Reinet. This merger resulted in there being seven local municipalities within the Sarah Baartman District.

Demographics
The following statistics are from the 2001 census.

Gender

Ethnic group

Age

Politics

Election results
Election results for Cacadu in the South African general election, 2004. 
 Population 18 and over: 252,570 [65.06% of total population]
 Total votes: 161,399 [41.58% of total population]
 Voting % estimate: 63.90% votes as a % of population 18 and over

References

External links 
 Sarah Baartman District Municipality Official Website

District municipalities of the Eastern Cape
Sarah Baartman District Municipality
Karoo